is a Japanese video game developer, game producer, game director and game designer. He was Senior Vice President of Software Development at Square Enix (formerly Square) and the head of the company's Product Development Division-3.

Biography
In 1983, Tanaka dropped out of Yokohama National University along with Hironobu Sakaguchi to join Square, a newly formed software branch of the Denyuusha Electric Company. Along with Sakaguchi and Kazuhiko Aoki, Tanaka was part of Square's original Planning and Development department.

He is best known as the former lead developer of Final Fantasy XI, Square's first massively multiplayer online role playing game (MMORPG). He oversaw development of Final Fantasy XI and Final Fantasy XIV until late 2010.  He also worked in a prominent role for earlier single-player games including Secret of Mana, Seiken Densetsu 3, Xenogears, Threads of Fate, Chrono Cross, and the Nintendo DS version of Final Fantasy III. Tanaka also worked on the original Famicom version of Final Fantasy III in 1990.

Final Fantasy XIV received negative reception from critics and players, and was considered a financial loss for Square Enix.  Three months after its release in 2010, Tanaka was removed from the Final Fantasy XIV team and replaced by Naoki Yoshida.  At the Vana'diel Fan Festival 2012, an event celebrating Final Fantasy XI's 10th anniversary, Tanaka announced his departure from Square Enix due to health reasons. In 2012, Tanaka joined GungHo Online Entertainment as a freelance advisor to the company.

Game Credits

References

External links

Hiromichi Tanaka profile at MobyGames

1962 births
Final Fantasy designers
Japanese video game designers
Living people
Square Enix people